The Examiner group of newspapers are a set of four community newspapers owned by the Hearst Corporation, doing business as Houston Community Newspapers (HCN). The publications include the Bellaire Examiner, Memorial Examiner, River Oaks Examiner, and West University Examiner. All four newspapers were headquartered in the HCN Southwest Office-Central facility in Houston.

The Examiner Newspaper Group, Inc. was previously a separate newspaper company headquartered in Rice Village, Houston. It was later acquired by ASP Westward and later 1013 Star Communications, before becoming a part of the Hearst Corporation in 2016.

History
In 2001 George Boehme and Edwin Henry started the group, with Boehme as the publisher and Henry as the editor. The first publication from the group was the West University Examiner. The second one was the River Oaks Examiner, and the third publication, the Memorial Examiner, followed.

In 2004 the group won the "Best Community Newspaper Houston 2004" award from the Houston Press.

In 2006 George Boehme sold the Examiner Newspaper Group to ASP Westward, doing business as "Houston Community Newspapers", for $2.1 million. At the time, the purchase price was not disclosed.

In 2010 the Houston Press ranked the Examiner Newspaper Group division of the HCN the "Best Community Newspaper Houston 2010".

In 2012 1013 Star Communications acquired Houston Community Newspapers from ASP Westward. In 2016 the Hearst Corporation acquired Houston Community Newspapers. It is the parent company of the Houston Chronicle. As part of the deal the Examiner papers became a part of the Hearst Corporation.

See also
 Village News and Southwest News

References

External links
 - Bellaire-River Oaks-West University Examiner
 - Memorial Examiner
  (Examiner under 10/13)
  (as an independent publication and while under ASP Westward)

Newspapers published in Texas
Publishing companies established in 2001
Publications established in 2001
Companies based in Houston
2001 establishments in Texas
Hearst Communications publications